Ellis Rashad Wyms  (born April 12, 1979) is a former American football defensive tackle. He was originally drafted by the Tampa Bay Buccaneers in the sixth round of the 2001 NFL Draft. He played college football at Mississippi State.

Wyms, who earned a Super Bowl ring with the Buccaneers in Super Bowl XXXVII, has also played for the Seattle Seahawks, Minnesota Vikings and Florida Tuskers.

College career
Wyms went to Mississippi State and played as a Bulldog. He racked up 120 career tackles, with 69 solo tackles. He also collected 10 quarterback sacks in just 40 career games for the Mississippi State Bulldogs. Wyms started on the defensive line eight times as a senior. Wyms was the Bulldogs' top reserve player. In his first career start, against Oklahoma State, Wyms racked up six tackles. He majored in technology and education.

Professional career

Tampa Bay Buccaneers
Wyms was drafted by the Tampa Bay Buccaneers with the 183rd pick of the 2001 NFL Draft, in the sixth round. In his first season, he played in four games (at the Detroit Lions, vs. the New Orleans Saints, vs. the Baltimore Ravens, and vs. the Philadelphia Eagles. However, he did not start until the Philadelphia Eagles playoff game in which the Buccaneers lost.

Ellis Wyms did not start a game in the Bucs' Super Bowl-winning season, but he ranked third on the team with 5.5 sacks. Throughout the season, he recorded 38 tackles, 5.5 sacks, two forced fumbles, and one fumble recovery. Wyms registered his first career sack against the Baltimore Ravens. During the divisional playoffs game versus the San Francisco 49ers, Wyms played along the defensive line often, racking up five tackles and defending one pass. In Super Bowl XXXVII against the Oakland Raiders, Wyms sacked Raiders quarterback Rich Gannon. He also added three tackles against the Raiders.

Wyms played in 13 games in the 2003 season, but the Bucs slumped from their Super Bowl glory to a 7–9 record. Wyms missed the last three games of the season after being placed on injured reserve because of a sprained left knee. Despite the injury, Wyms recorded 22 tackles, two sacks, and three defended passes on the season.

Wyms also had a shortened season in 2004 because of injury. He played in six games before leaving on October 23, 2004, for injured reserve due to a shoulder injury. In this season for the Buccaneers (5–11 record),Wyms totaled 19 tackles, two of them for losses. He eclipsed his career-high tackle mark against the Denver Broncos with 8 tackles. Wyms also contributed eight tackles against the St. Louis Rams.

In the Buccaneers' first playoff season since 2002, he played in all 16 games, and started against the New England Patriots. However, the defense allowed 28 points and the Buccaneers were shut out by the reigning NFL champions and Wyms allowed quite a few runs up the middle. Wyms appeared in his 50th career game against the Carolina Panthers on December 11, 2005. Ellis Wyms finished the season with 17 tackles, two sacks, one forced fumble, one fumble recovery, and one pass defensed. He also sacked Washington Redskins quarterback Mark Brunell in their wildcard contest.

On September 1, 2007, the Bucs released him.

Seattle Seahawks
He signed with the Seattle Seahawks before the 2007 season. He appeared in 13 games (no starts) for the team and recorded 11 tackles. He became a free agent after the season.

Minnesota Vikings
On March 17, 2008, Wyms signed a one-year contract with the Minnesota Vikings worth $1.5 million and including a $500,000 signing bonus.

Personal
Wyms contributes to the community through the "Strong Minds, Strong Bodies" program. Ellis Wyms is also the founder of The Wyms Foundation. The program provides monthly reading activities and career advice to underprivileged children in the city of Tampa. He also participates in many community activities. In high school, he recorded 124 tackles and 7 sacks. Wyms is married to real estate consultant DeeDee Wyms.

References

External links
Tampa Bay Buccaneers bio

1979 births
Living people
People from Indianola, Mississippi
American football defensive ends
American football defensive tackles
Mississippi State Bulldogs football players
Tampa Bay Buccaneers players
Seattle Seahawks players
Minnesota Vikings players
Florida Tuskers players